Abuja Chamber of Commerce and Industry (ACCI) is a non-profit, non-governmental organization that represents the interests of the business community in Abuja, Nigeria. The organization was founded in August 1986 with the goal of promoting trade, investment, and economic development in the region. The director general is Victoria Akai.

In April 2022, the ACCI established the Tourism and Creative Industry Trade Group to expand sustainable adventure tourism opportunities in Nigeria and networking among members, as well as for job creation, infrastructural development, and cultural exchange between foreigners and citizens.

In December 2022, The East African Business Council and the ACCI signed a memorandum of understanding to expand east-west trade collaboration.

International trade fair 
The Federal Government of Nigeria accorded ACCI the International Trade Fair license in 1998 giving birth to the Abuja International Trade Fair.

See also 
Lagos Chamber of Commerce and Industry

References

External links
Official Website

Organizations established in 1986
1986 establishments in Nigeria
Chambers of commerce

Chambers of commerce in Nigeria
Organizations based in Abuja